"Hypnotized" is a single by British vocalist Mark Stewart, released in May 1985 on Mute Records.

Formats and track listing 
All songs written by Mark Stewart.
UK 7" single (7 MUTE 037)
"Hypnotized" (edit) – 3:59
"As the Veneer of Democracy Starts to Fade" – 5:33

UK 12" single (12 MUTE 037)
"Hypnotized" (remix) – 7:24
"As the Veneer of Democracy Starts to Fade" – 5:33
"Dreamers" – 6:29

Accolades

Personnel 
The Maffia
Keith LeBlanc – drums, percussion
Skip McDonald – guitar
Adrian Sherwood – sampler, programming, production
Doug Wimbish – bass guitar
Mark Stewart – vocals

Charts

References

External links 
 

1985 songs
1985 debut singles
Mute Records singles
Song recordings produced by Adrian Sherwood
Mark Stewart (English musician) songs
Songs written by Mark Stewart (English musician)